Niya (Polish: Nyja , Nija , Latin: Nya) is a Lechitic god of the underworld of unknown sex, whose exact functions are unknown. Niya is mentioned together with other gods worshipped by Poles, such as Yesha, Łada, or Devana. Niya's cult may be demonstrated by the sayings "Go to Niye" ("pójść do Nyje") and "Dwell in Nya" ("bydlić w Nyi") collected by Polish ethnographer Aleksander Brückner. In recent years, the confidence in the authenticity of Niya has increased in the scientific community.

Etymology 
According to Stanisław Urbańczyk, the name Niya comes from the root ny-, which appears in the Old Polish word nyć, meaning "to fade, disappear". The variant naw appears in Ruthenian and Bulgarian in the forms nav, navje, navka. Andrzej Szyjewski agrees with this claim, adding that Niya is an echo of the proto-Slavic word *nawь meaning "corpse", "deceased." In Bulgarian spells, there are "twelve naves" as evil demons spreading the plague, and South Slavic navije or navje are seen as evil birds harassing pregnant women. In the Eastern Slavs, "navya bone" was used in rites related to death. In other Slavic languages nici means "lying face downwards" which indicates the downward direction and chthonic afterlife.

Oleg Trubachyov also noted the relationship between the proto-Slavic word *navь and the Proto-Indo-European word *nāu, meaning "to flow", and pointed to the Latin word navis meaning "boat". This would connect Niya with the function of a psychopomp and in that case would be the equivalent of the Greek Charon.

Aleksander Brückner took the name from the word niti meaning "to rot", "to molder".

Sources 
The first source mentioning a deity named Niya is theologian Lucas of Wielki Koźmin. As the most likely author of the Gniezno sermon created in the years 1410–1412 for bishop Wojciech Jastrzębiec, he wrote:

Statua provincialia breviter from 1420–1422 mentions the name of the god as Tya/Tiya:

Jan Długosz describes the cult of Nya, presenting him as the Polish equivalent of Pluto and his temple in Gniezno:

After Długosz, the cult of Nya is described by Maciej Stryjkowski:

Jakub Parkoszowic writes about Nya as a god of Poles independently of sources from Jan Długosz in his traktat o ortografii polskiej ("treatise on Polish orthography"):
After Długosz, the cult of Nya is also described by Maciej Miechowita.  Niya was also mentioned by Marcin Bielski and his son Joachim and by priest Jakub Wujek together with other gods worshipped by Poles. Sermones per circulum anni Cunradi from 1423 mentions about god named Yaya which is believed to be other version of name of Niya.

Description

Temple in Gniezno 
When writing about Niya, Długosz mentions a temple that was to be built in his honour in Gniezno. Archaeological research carried out at Lech Hill revealed the presence of a stone structure in the form of a mound on which were found fragments of animal bones and early-medieval ceramics, probably representing traces of sacrifices there. In addition, at the top of the hill there was a periodically wet basin, which in the theological vision of the world could emphasize the sacred (aquatic-chtonic) character of the place. Archaeologist Paweł Szczepanik interprets it as a remnant of a cult site corresponding to the temple mentioned in the chronicle of Długosz.

Interpretations 
Grzegorz Niedzielski believes that Tiya (and/or Diya) is not a distortion of the name Niya but rather the other name of Niya. He derives Diya and Tiya from dąć, tchnąć – "to blow, breathe" from which comes dech, tchnienie – "breath", followed by duch "spirit", dusza "soul", natchnienie "inspiration". The Greek term for god – θεός (theós) – is to come from the same indoeuropean root *dheu-. He also notes the connections between characters with similar names and the underworld in Greek mythology: nymph Thynia is said to be the mother of Delphus who replaced Python as Delphic oracle and the name Python is derived from the same root as the Indic mythological serpent Ahi Budhnya and badnjak. Semele changed her name to Thyone after she was rescued by her son Dionysus from Hades and she is related to Dionysian frenzy – inspiration. Anthesteria is festival of Dionysus where dead were resurrected. A similar relationship can be found in Slavdom: vilas, Bulgarian wilněja ("crazy, someone who lost his mind"), Czech wilny ("voluptuous"), Slavic velna ("wave, waters") and Panslavic god of underground Veles (probably from *wel – death). Latin word thya, thyon means "fragrant tree" and brings to mind a wooden log depicting badnjak. He also notes the similarity of the names of Niya, badnjak, badnik and bannik, suggesting the common sound cluster "b-(d)-n-j" (also existing in the name Ahi Budhnya), similar to the word bezdenna [przepaść], the "bottomless [pit]" connected to the abode of god of underground. In that case Niya's name could mean "Disappearing [in the abyss]" and be equivalent to the meaning of Hades's name "The Unseen One, The Invisible One".

For Alexander Gieysztor, Niya is the equivalent of Pluto. Brückner, who was hypercritical of the Długosz pantheon, said that Niya could indeed be a pagan remnant. According to Krzysztof Witczak, Niya is the Slavic equivalent of the Greek goddess Enyo. Both were supposed to be the remains of a proto-Indo-European goddess, "the perpetrator, the performer of disappearance, i.e. drying, disappearing", and reconstructed the name of this goddess as *Nūyā. Szczepaniak states that Niya is a female deity, caring for the dead, human fate and the community of the living. For Kolankiewicz, Niya was the equivalent of Veles as guardian of souls of the dead and synonymous with the moon.

References

Bibliography 

 
 
 
 
 

Slavic gods
Death gods
Earth gods
Underworld gods
Water gods